Chlorophorus manillae is a species of beetle in the family Cerambycidae. It was described by Per Olof Christopher Aurivillius in 1911.

References

Clytini
Beetles described in 1911